Acrion was a Locrian and a Pythagorean philosopher.  He is mentioned by Valerius Maximus under the name of Arion. According to William Smith, Arion is a false reading of Acrion.

Notes

References
 

Pythagoreans of Magna Graecia
Epizephyrian Locrians